The enzyme phenylalanine racemase (phenylalanine racemase, phenylalanine racemase (adenosine triphosphate-hydrolysing), gramicidin S synthetase I) is the enzyme that acts on amino acids and derivatives. It activates both the L & D stereo isomers of phenylalanine to form L-phenylalanyl adenylate and D-phenylalanyl adenylate, which are bound to the enzyme. These bound compounds are then transferred to the thiol group of the enzyme followed by conversion of its configuration, the D-isomer being the more favorable configuration of the two, with a 7 to 3 ratio between the two isomers.  The racemisation reaction of phenylalanine is coupled with the highly favorable hydrolysis of adenosine triphosphate (ATP) to adenosine monophosphate (AMP) and pyrophosphate (PP), thermodynamically allowing it to proceed.  This reaction is then drawn forward by further hydrolyzing PP to inorganic phosphate (Pi), via Le Chatelier's principle.

Other names

phenylalanine racemase
phenylalanine racemase (adenosine triphosphate-hydrolysing)
gramicidin S synthetase I

Pathway

 Phenylalanine Metabolism

Substrate

 L – Phenylalanine

Product

 D - Phenylalanine

Cofactor

 Pyridoxal-phosphate (active form of vitamin B6)

Links to disease

Problems in the digestion of phenylalanine (phe) to tyrosine (tyr) lead to the buildup of both phe and phenylpyruvate, in a disease called Phenylketonuria (PKU).  These two compounds build up in the blood stream and cerebral spinal fluid, which can lead to mental retardation if left untreated.  Treatment consists of a restricted diet of foods that contain phe or compounds that can breakdown into phe.  Children in the US are routinely tested for this at birth.  For more information see the Phenylketonuria page or the link below.

Quick facts

 pH Range = 7.2 – 8.6
 Equilibrium Ratio:L-Phe:D-Phe = 3:7
 Specific Activity: 0.019

The reaction

  
  
  
|}

See also

Phenylalanine
Racemase
Phenylketonuria

References

External links 
 Protein Data Bank 1amu 

Metabolism
EC 5.1.1